Jeanne d'Arc School was a prestigious French school for girls founded in 1900 in Tehran, Iran. It operated until the 1979 Islamic Revolution. Many members of Iran's upper classes sent their daughters to the Jeanne d'Arc School, and it offered both primary and secondary education. French and English were taught as foreign languages at the Jeanne d’Arc School.

History 
The school was founded by the French Catholic Daughters of Charity of Saint Vincent de Paul. Its origins are traced back to the St. Vincent de Paul School founded in 1865, and the St. Joseph School founded in 1880. 

In the early 1960s, the Jeanne d'Arc School had  pupils. In the dawn of the Islamic Revolution of 1979, it had 1,600 pupils. As instruction ended at tenth grade, the more prosperous students of the Jeanne d'Arc School usually chose one of two options. They either completed high school (i.e. until twelfth grade) at the Lycée Razi in Tehran which offered mixed boys-girls classes, or they continued their studies abroad.

Notable people

Alumni 
 Farideh Ghotbi
 Shokufeh Kavani
 Minoo Moshiri
 Farah Diba Pahlavi

Faculty 
 Farrokhroo Parsa

References

Sources
 
 
 

Defunct schools in Iran
Schools in Tehran
1900s establishments in Iran
1979 disestablishments in Iran
France–Iran relations
Qajar Iran
Pahlavi Iran